TSS Dover, (later the Earl Siward, Sol Express and now the Tuxedo Royale), was a British ferry. Built in 1965 as a roll-on/roll-off (RORO) ferry, she spent much of her later life as one of the permanently moored Tuxedo floating nightclubs before being laid up, latterly on the River Tees in Middlesbrough.

TSS Dover was built on the River Tyne in England by Swan Hunter in Wallsend, Tyne and Wear. She was launched on 17 March 1965 and completed by June 1965. In 1977 she was renamed Earl Siward, and again in 1982 as the Sol Express. In 1993 she became the nightclub the Tuxedo Royale.

Entered the National Historic ships register in 2016 and spent a period waiting to be restored by the Tuxedo Royale Restoration project.

On 1 June 2017 Tuxedo Royale was badly damaged by fire.

On 18 January 2018 Able UK announced that seven years after the owners went into administration, and with the lack of "any credible plans to move and restore the ship" the dismantling had begun.

References

External links
The project website

1965 ships
Ferries of the United Kingdom
Ships built by Swan Hunter
Ships of British Rail
Steamships of the United Kingdom
Ships built on the River Tyne